A getter is a substance introduced into a vacuum tube to remove traces of gas.

Getter may also refer to:

Getter, a term used in object-oriented programming, also known as accessor
Getter Robo, fictional robot
Getter (name), Estonian feminine given name
Getter (DJ), American DJ
Gettr, a social media site

See also
Get (disambiguation)